Polyipnus asper is a species of ray-finned fish in the genus Polyipnus. It is found in the Eastern Indian Ocean in shallow waters from 0 - 384 meters.

References

Sternoptychidae
Fish described in 1994